Gearbox Software is an American video game development company based in Frisco, Texas. It was established as a limited liability company in February 1999 by five developers formerly of Rebel Boat Rocker. Randy Pitchford, one of the founders, serves as president and chief executive officer. Gearbox initially created expansions for the Valve game Half-Life, then ported that game and others to console platforms. In 2005, Gearbox launched its first independent set of games, Brothers in Arms, on console and mobile devices. It became their flagship franchise and spun off a comic book series, television documentary, books, and action figures. Their second original game series, Borderlands, commenced in 2009, and by 2015 had sold over 26 million copies. The company also owns the intellectual property of Duke Nukem and Homeworld.

Gearbox expanded into publishing with the creation of Gearbox Publishing in 2015. A parent company, The Gearbox Entertainment Company, was established for Gearbox Software and Gearbox Publishing in 2019. Gearbox Entertainment was acquired by the Embracer Group in April 2021, becoming its seventh major label. A third division, Gearbox Studios, to focus on television and film productions, was established in October 2021.

History

Formation and initial growth (1999–2008)

Gearbox Software was founded on February 16, 1999, by Randy Pitchford, Brian Martel, Stephen Bahl, Landon Montgomery and Rob Heironimus, five developers formerly of Rebel Boat Rocker. Before Rebel Boat Rocker, Pitchford and Martel previously worked together at 3D Realms, and Montgomery previously worked at Bethesda Softworks. By 2000, the company employed 15 people.

They started with developing expansions to Valve's Half-Life. Porting Half-Life to console platforms (each with new game content) followed, building the company's experience in console game-making, in addition to enhancing and building upon the successful Counter-Strike branch of the Half-Life franchise. Prior to Half-Life 2, they had developed or helped develop every Half-Life expansion game or port, including Opposing Force, Blue Shift, Counter-Strike: Condition Zero, Half-Life for the Sony PlayStation 2 (including Half-Life: Decay), and Half-Life for the Sega Dreamcast (including Blue Shift). Branching out to other publishers, they pursued additional port work, each game being released with additional content, but this time from console to PC. These projects included their first non-first-person shooter, Tony Hawk's Pro Skater 3, and Halo: Combat Evolved, forging new publisher relationships with Activision and Microsoft Game Studios respectively. Additional new development, in the form of a PC game in the James Bond franchise (James Bond 007: Nightfire) for Electronic Arts, also occurred during the company's initial 5-year period.

In 2005, they launched an original property of their creation, Brothers in Arms, with the release of Brothers in Arms: Road to Hill 30 on the Xbox, PC and PlayStation 2. Later that year a sequel, Brothers in Arms: Earned in Blood, was launched. In 2008, Brothers in Arms: Hell's Highway was released.

2007 brought announcements of new projects based on licensed film intellectual properties, including the crime drama Heat and the science-fiction classic Aliens. In the September 2007 issue of Game Informer, Pitchford stated that development on the Heat game had not yet begun, as the planned development partner for the project had gone under. This was followed by an announcement by Sega that they would be helming a new version of rhythm game Samba de Amigo for the Wii, a departure from their signature first-person shooter titles.

Borderlands and studio expansion (2009–2015)
Work on a new intellectual property, Borderlands, began around 2005 and was first announced in 2007. Pitchford likened the game as a combination of computer role-playing games such as Diablo and NetHack, and first-person shooters like Duke Nukem. Defining features of Borderlands was its cel-shading graphics style and its procedurally-generated loot system that was capable of generating millions of different guns and other gear items. Borderlands was released in October 2009, published by 2K, a subsidiary of Take-Two Interactive. By August 2011, had sold over 4.5 million copies, making it a critical success for Gearbox and allowing them to expand the studio and budgets for subsequent games. Subsequently, Gearbox developed two additional games in the video game series, Borderlands 2 (2012) and Borderlands 3 (2019), as well as the spin-off title Tiny Tina's Wonderlands (2022), and the series has spawn additional games from other studios under 2K/Take-Two or through license, including Borderlands: The Pre-Sequel by 2K Australia, and Tales from the Borderlands from Telltale Games. Gearbox and Take-Two have also partnered with Lionsgate to develop a live-action Borderlands film, which as of November 2022 is in post-production.

In July 2013, Gearbox announced plans to rerelease Homeworld and Homeworld 2 in high definition for modern PC platforms, in addition to making it available through digital distributors.

In July 2014, Randy Pitchford formally contested the Aliens: Colonial Marines class action lawsuit stating the game had cost them millions of their own money and the advertising was solely the fault of the publisher.

In December 2015, Gearbox opened a second development studio in Quebec City, Canada. The studio is run by Sebastien Caisse and former Activision art director Pierre-Andre Dery. The team consists of over 100 members and is contributing to the development of original AAA titles.

Restructuring and acquisition by Embracer Group (2015–present)
Gearbox established Gearbox Publishing in 2015, first announced to the public in December 2016, as to publish third-party games, starting with the remastered version of Bulletstorm from People Can Fly. Pitchford said that they wanted to start expanding into other areas of capital growth beyond games that Gearbox was traditionally known for, and planned to use Gearbox Publishing as a starting point. Later, in May 2019, Gearbox established The Gearbox Entertainment Company, Inc. (Gearbox Entertainment) as a parent company for both Gearbox Software and Gearbox Publishing.

Co-founder Landon Montgomery, who had left the company around 2007, died on March 25, 2020.

Pitchford stated that while they were looking to raise capital from 2016, they came to meet with Embracer, and saw that their decentralized studio model would work well for Gearbox. 2K remained on Gearbox's board and continued to publish the Borderlands series.

Gearbox Entertainment opened a second Canadian studio, Gearbox Studio Montreal, in August 2021, to support 250 new staff, bringing the total size of Gearbox to around 850 employees.

Gearbox announced the formation of Gearbox Studios as a third company under the Gearbox Entertainment Company on October 6, 2021, to oversee television and film productions, with Pitchford serving as Gearbox Studios president alongside as president and CEO of the parent company. Former CTO Steve Jones was named as president of Gearbox Software in Pitchford's place. Embracer announced it intent to acquire Perfect World Entertainment in December 2021 and placing the group, including its publishing arm and Cryptic Studios, under the Gearbox Entertainment operating group. Following its acquisition in April 2022, Perfect World Entertainment was rebranded as Gearbox Publishing San Francisco, with the naming to be applied retroactively to past games published under Perfect World.

Gearbox Entertainment announced they will acquire Lost Boys Interactive, who had supported Gearbox in Tiny Tina's Wonderlands, in April 2022. Later that November, Gearbox acquired the Risk of Rain IP from Hopoo Games, while Embracer transferred ownership of Volition to Gearbox Entertainment from Deep Silver following poor reception to their Saint's Row reboot. Further, Eidos Shanghai, another studio under the Embracer Group, was transferred to Gearbox Publishing San Francisco and rebranded as Gearbox Studio Shanghai that same month. Gearbox Entertainment acquired Captured Dimensions, a 3D modeling company from Texas, in January 2023.

Company structure
As of March 2023, The Gearbox Entertainment Company, as an operating division of Embracer Group, manages four primary divisions of Gearbox: Gearbox Software which develops video games, Gearbox Studios which oversees other media productions based on Gearbox's properties, Gearbox Publishing which handles publishing of Gearbox and other third-party software and Gearbox Properties which manages the intellectual properties of the company.

The Gearbox Entertainment Company now oversees Perfect World Entertainment (rebranded as Gearbox Publishing San Francisco) and its subsidiaries, including Cryptic Studios, following approval of Embracer's acquisition of the company completed by February 2022.

Gearbox Software has three additional studios in addition to their main studios in Frisco, Texas; Gearbox Studio Montreal, Gearbox Studio Québec, and Gearbox Studio Shanghai. The latter one is managed by Gearbox Publishing San Francisco.

 The Gearbox Entertainment Company
 Captured Dimensions
 Cryptic Studios
 Gearbox Publishing
 Gearbox Publishing San Francisco
 Gearbox Studio Shanghai
 Gearbox Properties
 Gearbox Software
 Gearbox Studio Montréal
 Gearbox Studio Québec
 Gearbox Studios
 Lost Boys Interactive
 Volition

Games

Half-Life 

Gearbox has developed a total of six games in the Half-Life series: the expansion packs Opposing Force and Blue Shift; ports of Half-Life for Dreamcast (which included Blue Shift) and Half-Life for PlayStation 2 (which included Half-Life: Decay); they also did a large amount of work on both the retail release of Counter-Strike and the main portion of Counter-Strike: Condition Zero.

Brothers in Arms 

During their fourth year, Gearbox began working on their first independently owned game: Brothers in Arms: Road to Hill 30. Developed for PC and Microsoft's Xbox console, and built with the Unreal Engine 2, it was released in March 2005. The sequel, Brothers in Arms: Earned in Blood, followed seven months later. The series was published by Ubisoft, who supported both games with PlayStation 2 versions, and later worked with them to develop Brothers in Arms games for portable systems (mobile phones, PlayStation Portable and Nintendo DS) and the Wii home console.

In 2005, Gearbox licensed the Unreal Engine 3 from Epic Games, to replace the Unreal Engine 2 technology used in previous games, and grew its internal development teams to handle the demands of next-generation technology and content. Brothers in Arms: Hell's Highway was the first new title to be announced, continuing the company's flagship franchise.

Brothers in Arms: Hell's Highway was launched in September 2008. By 2008, the franchise also spun off a comic book series, a two-part television documentary, a line of action figures, and a novelization and non-fiction history book.

Borderlands series 

After the completion of Brothers in Arms: Earned in Blood, Gearbox began working on their second original game, Borderlands. Revealed in the September 2007 issue of Game Informer, Borderlands was described as "Mad Max meets Diablo", and its first-person shooter-meets-role-playing gameplay was revealed, along with screenshots of the early art style and the first three playable characters. The gaming press saw the game next at the European GamesCon in 2007, and again at GamesCon and E3 in 2008. In early 2009, it was revealed in PC Gamer magazine that they had changed the graphical style and added the fourth player character. Borderlands was released in 2009.

Following the unexpected success of the first Borderlands, which sold between three to four-and-a-half million copies since release, creative director Mike Neumann stated that there was a chance of a Borderlands 2 being created, adding that the decision "seems like a no-brainer." On August 2, 2011, the game was confirmed and titled as Borderlands 2. The first look at the game was shown at Gamescom 2011, and an extensive preview was included in the September edition of Game Informer magazine, with Borderlands 2 being the cover story. Like the first game, Borderlands 2 was developed by Gearbox Software and published by 2K Games, running on a heavily modified version of Epic Games' Unreal Engine 3. The game was released on September 18, 2012, in North America and was released on September 21, 2012, internationally.

Duke Nukem series 

Duke Nukem Forever had been a project with a troubled development history at 3D Realms, who had created the Duke Nukem series, since sometime prior to 2000. Due to financial difficulties in 2009, 3D Realms was forced to downsize and ultimately lay off most of the development staff. Take-Two Interactive sued 3D Realms for failing to deliver Duke Nukem Forever.

Pitchford, who had prior industry relations with many 3D Realms staff including George Broussard, learned that many of the 3D Realms team were still eager to develop Duke Nukem Forever, working out of their homes on what they could. Pitchford negotiated with Take-Two to bring many of the former 3D Realms staff into a new studio called Triptych Games, housed at Gearbox's headquarters, to continue working on Duke Nukem Forever following 3D Realms' closure in 2009. As a result, 3D Realms sold the rights to Duke Nukem and the existing work on Duke Nukem Forever to Gearbox around February 2010. Take-Two and Gearbox subsequently announced in September 2010 that Gearbox would finish production of Duke Nukem Forever. Duke Nukem Forever was released in June 2011, and received negative critical reception on release, with most of the criticism directed towards the unfinished, rushed state of the game. Despite the criticism, the game topped the charts on release and made a profit.

3D Realms had initially sued Gearbox in June 2013 for unpaid royalties over Duke Nukem Forever, but dropped the suit by September 2013, with 3D Realms' founder Scott Miller stating that it was a misunderstanding on their part.

3D Realms was eventually acquired in part by Interceptor Entertainment, and in 2014, Interceptor announced plans to make a new Duke Nukem game, Duke Nukem: Mass Destruction. Gearbox filed suit against 3D Realms and Interceptor based on the fact that Gearbox now owned the rights to the Duke Nukem franchise. The case was settled out of court in August 2015, with 3D Realms and Interceptor acknowledging that Gearbox has full rights to the Duke Nukem series. Following the settlement, Gearbox released Duke Nukem 3D: 20th Anniversary Edition World Tour in September 2016. The game included new levels developed in conjunction with some of the original developers, re-recorded lines by original Duke voice actor Jon St. John, and new music from original composer Lee Jackson. It was released on October 11, 2016.

Aliens: Colonial Marines 
Aliens: Colonial Marines was a result of Gearbox's exploration into working on licensed film properties in 2007, and was developed under license from 20th Century Fox, who held the film rights, and Sega, who held the game publishing rights to the franchise. Aliens: Colonial Marines was planned as a first-person shooter, both single-player and multiplayer, with players as members of human squads facing the franchises titular xenomorphs in settings based on the films. Gearbox did initial development on the game, but as the studio started working on Borderlands and Duke Nukem Forever, they drew developers off Aliens though still collected full payments from Sega. Sega and 2K discovered the discrepancy on Gearbox's allocation of its staff on its projects, which lead to a round of layoffs in 2008.

After Gearbox released Borderlands to critical acclaim in 2009, it began work on its sequel rather than re-allocating developers to Aliens. Instead, the studio outsourced the work to third parties, including Demiurge Studios, Nerve Software, and TimeGate Studios. By 2012, Gearbox took over full development of the game as it neared its planned release in February 2013, but due to the heavily outsourced process, the game's state was haphazard, forcing Gearbox to cancel a planned beta period and rush the game through the final stages of production, certification, and distribution. On release, the game suffered from performance issues even on target hardware specifications, and shipped with a software bug that hampered the artificial intelligence of the xenomorphs in the game, making the game far less challenging than promised; it was discovered in 2019 that this bug was result of a typographic error in a configuration file shipped with the game. The game's poor performance led Sega to cancel planned releases for the Wii U.

A class action lawsuit filed in April 2013 by Roger Damion Perrine and John Locke alleged that Gearbox and Sega falsely advertised Aliens: Colonial Marines by showing demos at trade shows that did not accurately represent the final product. Sega and the plaintiffs reached a settlement in late 2014, wherein Sega agreed to pay $1.25 million to the class. The plaintiffs dropped Gearbox from the suit in May 2015.

Battleborn 

Released in May 2016, Battleborn was a cooperative first-person shooter video game with multiplayer online battle arena (MOBA) elements. Battleborn takes place in a space fantasy setting where multiple races contest possession of the universe's last star. Players select one of multiple pre-defined heroes, customized with passive abilities gained through end-of-mission loot, to complete both player-vs-player and player-vs-environment events. During such events, characters are leveled up through their "Helix tree", granting one of two abilities at each level. While Battleborn was well received by critics, it was released within a month of Blizzard Entertainment's Overwatch, a hero shooter with similar concepts, and which quickly overshadowed Battleborn. The title went free-to-play in June 2017 and was shut down in January 2021.

Homeworld series 

After 10 years without any new releases to the series, Gearbox acquired the rights to the Homeworld series from THQ in 2013. Shortly after that the Homeworld Remastered Collection was released in 2015, containing updated High-Definition versions of Homeworld and Homeworld 2 compatible with modern Windows and Mac OS X systems.

In September 2013, Gearbox announced a partnership with Blackbird Interactive and licensing the Homeworld-IP for their then-named Hardware: Shipbreakers game. This game later became Homeworld: Deserts of Kharak and was released on January 20, 2016 as a prequel to the original Homeworld game of 1999.

On August 30, 2019, Gearbox announced Homeworld 3 which will again be developed by Blackbird Interactive. The game's development is at least partially funded through a crowdfunding campaign on the Fig platform.

Other media 
A Borderlands film has been in development with Gearbox and Lionsgate since around 2015, with Eli Roth set to direct. As of June 2021, the film is done filming.

In April 2020, Gearbox announced it was developing a television series based on its Brothers in Arms series.

Technology 
In 2006, they partnered with Dell and Intel to provide development computer systems and technology for their studio.

In June 2007, they purchased a Moven motion capture system that uses non-optical inertia technology, to augment their existing Vicon optical motion capture system becoming one of the few independent developers with two in-house motion capture capabilities.

In February 2008, it was announced that they had licensed NaturalMotion's Morpheme software.

List of video games

Games developed

Games published

References

External links 
 

1999 establishments in Texas
2021 mergers and acquisitions
American companies established in 1999
American subsidiaries of foreign companies
Companies based in Frisco, Texas
Embracer Group
Video game companies based in Texas
Video game companies established in 1999
Video game development companies